The Directorate General Air Intelligence, known as "Air Intelligence" and its acronym "AI", is the intelligence arm of the Pakistan Air Force. It is headquartered in Islamabad, Pakistan.

The AI is responsible for the formulation of the aerial intelligence picture, and participates in forging the overall intelligence view as part of the Intelligence Community of Pakistan. It operates several research and collection units, including the Technical Assistance Unit (formerly the Air Photography Unit) which analyses aerial photography, and the Zoom Unit which studies the procurement of new aircraft, and AI also works alongside the Military Intelligence and the Naval Intelligence as well as with the Inter-Services Intelligence.

AI is reportedly much active on Pakistan's western borders with major contribution in Counter intelligence/Counter Terrorism operations in western part  and inside Afghanistan as well as monitors all the Drone activities as well as other Afghan and Coalition Aerial Activity.

Pakistan Air Force
Pakistani intelligence agencies
Air intelligence